Shavar or Shovar may refer to:
 Shovar, Chaharmahal and Bakhtiari
 Shavar, Khuzestan